Allure of the Seas is an  owned and operated by Royal Caribbean International. , the Oasis class ships were the largest passenger vessels ever in service, and Allure is  longer than her sister ship Oasis of the Seas, though both were built to the same specifications. Designed under the name "Project Genesis", she was ordered from Aker Finnyards in February 2006 and her construction began at the Perno shipyard, Turku, Finland, in February 2008. She was named in May 2008 after a contest was held to name her and her sister. The keel of Allure of the Seas was laid on 2 December 2008, shortly after the shipyard had been acquired by STX Europe.

Upon her launch in November 2009, she became the world's largest passenger ship, taking the place of Oasis of the Seas. She was eclipsed by her sister ship Harmony of the Seas upon its launch in June 2015.

History 
The keel of Allure of the Seas was laid on 2 December 2008 at the STX Europe Turku shipyard, Finland, during a ceremony involving Royal Caribbean and STX representatives. She was launched on 20 November 2009, with further outfitting taking place while afloat in the shipyard. Allure of the Seas was declared complete and formally delivered to Royal Caribbean on 28 October 2010. She left the Turku shipyard on 29 October 2010 at 05:45 UTC, heading directly to her home port of Port Everglades, near Fort Lauderdale, Florida, USA. The ship is equipped with telescoping funnels to pass under bridges such as the Storebælt Bridge, which she passed on 30 October 2010.

On 11 November 2010 at approximately 14:30 UTC, Allure of the Seas arrived at her home port of Port Everglades, Florida. She was greeted by thousands of spectators waiting on the shore.

The ship was formally named by her godmother, the fictional character Princess Fiona, in a ceremony on 28 November 2010.

In February 2014, Allure of the Seas entered dry dock at Grand Bahama island for seven days to replace a damaged gearbox in one of her Azipods. As the dry dock facility was not large enough to fully accommodate an Oasis-class ship, a unique solution had to be devised to allow the replacement, known as "Project Atlantis". During her time in dry dock, the crew used the downtime to make numerous repairs and refurbishments to the guest facilities, including the installation of new carpets.

Allure of the Seas sailed year-round in the Caribbean region out of Port Everglades from its homeporting in 2010 through 2014. She changed port to Barcelona and sailed the Mediterranean between May and October 2015, becoming the largest cruise ship and the first Oasis-class ship to spend a full season in that region. Afterward, she returned to Port Everglades.

Allure of the Seas changed its home port in November 2018 to the Port of Miami, where Royal Caribbean constructed a new cruise terminal. She was joined by the fourth Oasis-class vessel, Symphony of the Seas, and both sail year-round from the port offering seven-night Western and Eastern Caribbean cruises.

In March 2019, Allure of the Seas was named second for "Best Cruises Overall" in the 2019 Cruise Critic Cruisers' Choice Awards.

In early May 2019, the itinerary for some of the ship's sailings had to be adjusted due to a technical issue with one of the ship's propulsion pods, causing it to have to sail at a reduced speed.

Allure of the Seas was expected to be refitted in early 2020, which would have included the addition of approximately 50 more passenger cabins. However, due to the COVID-19 pandemic, this was delayed by Royal Caribbean to an unknown date. 

Starting in November 2022, Allure of the Seas will be based in Galveston, Texas, at the Port of Galveston's new cruise terminal.

Technical details 
The classified length of Allure of the Seas is the same as that of her sister, though she is reported to be  longer than Oasis of the Seas. According to the shipyard, this is not intentional and such small differences in length may occur simply due to the temperature of the steel in a ship as big as this. The gross tonnage of Allure of the Seas is 225,282 and her displacement is equal to that of Oasis of the Seas, which is estimated to be around 100,000 metric tons, slightly less than that of an American . Her steel hull alone weighs roughly 54,000 tons.

The ship features a two-deck dance hall, a theatre with 1,380 seats, an ice skating rink, 7 distinct "neighborhoods", and 25 dining options, including a Starbucks coffee shop at sea.  Many of the ship's interiors were extensively decorated by muralist Clarissa Parish.

Before beginning service from Port Everglades, Allure of the Seas was fitted with an 80 kW solar array by BAM Energy Group which powers the shopping district. It uses Uni-Solar BIPV laminates designed to withstand foot traffic and marine conditions.

Gallery

References

External links 

2009 ships
Ships built in Turku
Ships of Royal Caribbean International